Zee Marathi Utsav Natyancha Award is an awards ceremony held yearly, sponsored by Waman Hari Pethe Jewellers and presented by Zee Marathi. This event is held in the month of October for each year and awards are given to the best entertainers for variety programs aired on its channel. The first awards ceremony held in 2004 which was formerly known as Aapla Alpha Award.

Awards

2004
The awards ceremony was held on 14 August 2004. It was hosted by Bharat Dabholkar. This first award ceremony received 7.5 TVRs.

2005
The awards ceremony was held on 13 August 2005. It was hosted by Sachin Pilgaonkar.

2006
The awards ceremony was held on 12 August 2006. It was hosted by Sanjay Mone and Sumeet Raghavan.

2007
The awards ceremony was held on 28 October 2007. It was hosted by Pushkar Shrotri and Prasad Oak.

2008
The awards ceremony was held on 31 August 2008. It was hosted by Atul Parchure and Sumeet Raghavan.

2009
The awards ceremony was held on 30 August 2009. It was hosted by Nirmiti Sawant and Pushkar Shrotri.

2010
The awards ceremony was held on 31 October 2010. It was hosted by Sunil Barve.

2011
The awards ceremony was held on 9 October 2011. It was hosted by Pushkar Shrotri and Jitendra Joshi.

2012
The awards ceremony was held on 28 October 2012. It was hosted by Atul Parchure and Sumeet Raghavan.

2013
The awards ceremony was held on 27 October 2013. It was hosted by Hrishikesh Joshi.

2014
The awards ceremony was held on 26 October 2014. It was hosted by Sumeet Raghavan and Priyadarshan Jadhav.

2015
The awards ceremony was held on 1 November 2015. It was hosted by Pushkaraj Chirputkar and Amey Wagh.

2016
The awards ceremony was held on 23 October 2016. It was hosted by Vaibhav Mangle.

2017
The awards ceremony was held on 15 October 2017. It was hosted by Sanjay Mone and Atul Parchure. This function received 5.5 TRPs gaining third position in charts.

2018
The awards ceremony was held on 28 October 2018. It was hosted by Sanjay Mone and Abhijeet Khandkekar. This function received highest ever ratings for any Award ceremony with 8.0 TRPs.

2019
The awards ceremony was held on 20 October 2019. It was hosted by Zee Marathi family members.

2020-21
The awards ceremony was held on 28 March and 4 April 2021. It was hosted by Shashank Ketkar and Kiran Gaikwad.

2021
The awards ceremony was held on 30 October 2021. It was hosted by Anvita Phaltankar and Shalva Kinjawadekar.

2022
The awards ceremony was held on 15 October 2022. It was hosted by Sumeet Raghavan and Amey Wagh.

Current Categories

Best Series

Best Title Song

Best Family

Best Couple

Best Actor

Best Actress

Best Negative Actor

Best Negative Actress

Best Character Male

Best Character Female

Best Supporting Male

Best Supporting Female

Best Comedy Male

Best Comedy Female

Best Father

Best Mother

Best Father-in-law

Best Mother-in-law

Best Child Character

Best Daughter-in-law

Best Siblings

Best Friends

Best Grandfather

Best Grandmother

Best Anchor Male

Best Non-fiction Show

Former Categories

Best Composer

Best Anchor Female

Best Judge Male

Best Judge Female

Best Debut

Best Reality Show

Best Event

Best Discursive Show

Best Comedy Series

Special Categories

Special Striking Face

Lifetime Achievement Award

References

External links
 Official website at ZEE5

Zee Entertainment Enterprises